"Take Me to Church" is a song by Irish singer-songwriter Hozier. It was released as his debut single on 13 September 2013, originally featuring on his extended play of the same name, before being featured as the opening track of his 2014 debut album Hozier. A struggling musician at the time of its composition, Hozier wrote and recorded the song in the attic of his parents' home in County Wicklow. A mid-tempo soul song, its lyrics use religious terminology to describe a romantic relationship in the face of Church discrimination. The song caught the attention of Rubyworks Records, where producer Rob Kirwan collaborated with Hozier on the final recording.

The accompanying music video premiered in September 2013, directed by Brendan Canty, Emmet O'Brien and Conal Thomson. It was shot in black-and-white and follows a romantic relationship between two men and its subsequent violent homophobic backlash. Upon its YouTube release in September 2013, the video quickly went viral, leading to Hozier's subsequent license with Columbia Records US and Island Records UK. In 2014, the song achieved widespread global popularity, topping the charts in 12 countries and reaching the top 10 in 21 other territories. The song also received critical acclaim.

Aided by music platforms Shazam and Spotify to become a rock radio hit in the U.S., the song spent 23 consecutive weeks at the top of the Hot Rock Songs chart, tied with Imagine Dragons "Radioactive" as the longest-running number-one in its chart-history (at the time). "Take Me to Church" later crossed over to the Billboard Hot 100, where it peaked at number two in December 2014. The song was nominated for the Grammy Award for Song of the Year at the 57th Annual Grammy Awards and has been certified Diamond in the US.

Background and composition

In 2013, Hozier was a struggling musician, often seen in Dublin-area open mic nights. During this period, he penned "Take Me to Church" at his parents' home in Bray, County Wicklow, Ireland, and recorded a rough demo in their attic with a programmed backing track. He wrote the song after a bad breakup, as he later remarked that "the vocals were recorded in my attic at 2 o'clock in the morning. So it's a real homemade job."  It took him three months to write the song; only two musicians feature on the track: Hozier and drummer Fiachra Kinder. The demo caught the attention of independent label Rubyworks, which paired him with producer Rob Kirwan. The song was overdubbed with live instrumentation, but the original demo vocals were kept because Kirwan found them "powerful" enough to remain.

Lyrically, "Take Me to Church" is a metaphor, with the protagonist comparing his lover to religion. The song grew out of Hozier's frustration with the Catholic Church which, as somebody raised in the Protestant Quaker faith, he saw as dominating the social and political outlook of the Irish state. "Growing up, I always saw the hypocrisy of the Catholic Church", Hozier said in an interview with Rolling Stone. "The history speaks for itself and I grew incredibly frustrated and angry. I essentially just put that into my words."

In an interview with The Irish Times, Hozier stated that he "found the experience of falling in love or being in love was a death, a death of everything ... you kind of watch yourself die in a wonderful way, and you experience for the briefest moment–if you see yourself for a moment through their eyes–everything you believed about yourself gone." The song contains sexual undertones; Hozier elaborated that "an act of sex is one of the most human things ..but an organization like the church, say, through its doctrine, would undermine humanity by successfully teaching shame about sexual orientation ... the song is about asserting yourself and reclaiming your humanity through an act of love.

"Take Me to Church" draws inspiration from author Christopher Hitchens and paraphrases the poet Fulke Greville's verse "Created sick, commanded to be sound". The song's title was often misinterpreted by Christian pop listeners, with the message critiquing the Catholic Church lost in translation. In June 2019, Hozier explained that the intention behind "Take Me to Church" was to "write something that, that was a kind of celebration of sexuality." Hozier admitted that people took the title at "face value" and "were very upset when they found out that" it was not a song "actually about being taken to church."

Commercial performance

The song rose in prominence alongside its viral music video, attracting A&R representatives from major labels in a bidding war to sign Hozier. He was signed by Justin Eshak of Columbia Records, who later opined that the song became a hit due to a shift on pop radio, spearheaded by Sam Smith: "The music is connecting because when it gets on the air it's such a sharp juxtaposition to the existing material on top 40 radio." The song first experienced chart success in his native Ireland, climbing the charts in October 2013 and eventually reached number two on Irish Singles Chart.

In May 2014, Hozier performed the song on the Late Show with David Letterman. It was sent to US modern rock radio on 24 June 2014 by Columbia Records. It eventually reached number two on the Billboard Hot 100 for three consecutive weeks in December 2014 and January 2015, behind Taylor Swift's "Blank Space", while becoming his first top 10 single there. As of July 2015, the song has sold 4,270,000 copies in the US. The track has since reached top five in many other countries including peaking at number two in Australia, Canada, New Zealand, and the United Kingdom.

The song initially attracted US attention in Nashville via an adult album alternative radio station. From there, it became the top song for the area on music identification application Shazam, which led to its appearance on a local top 40 station. "Take Me to Church" achieved widespread popularity in the United States between the summer and fall of 2014.

Despite the song's popularity on YouTube, the song achieved more listens on Spotify, becoming the service's most-streamed song of 2014, achieving 87 million listens.

Track listing

Performances and use in media
Hozier performed the song at the Victoria Secret Fashion Show, 2014
Hozier performed the song with Annie Lennox at the 57th Grammy Awards on 5 February 2015,  at the Staples Center in Los Angeles.
 Matt McAndrew performed "Take Me to Church" on U.S. television program The Voice season 7 as his top 12 act. His cover peaked at number 5 on the iTunes charts and at number 92 on the Billboard Hot 100.
 The song was used in season 14 of the documentary series Intervention.
 The song was used in a commercial for Beats by Dre which featured LeBron James. The commercial showed James returning to his old high school in Akron, Ohio.
 The song was used in the second to last episode of the final season of Glee, sung by Roderick Meeks, Kitty Wilde, and Jane Howard played by Noah Guthrie, Becca Tobin, and Samantha Marie Ware respectively, in March 2015.
 Ellie Goulding posted a cover of "Take Me to Church" on her official YouTube channel. The cover was featured in the Supergirl episode "Livewire".
 Demi Lovato performed the song live from Live Lounge.
 The song was used in the closing credits of the third episode of the first season of The Leftovers.
 The song was featured in premiere series iZombie in its fourth season, Episode Two "Blue Bloody".
 India Carney performed this song on U.S. television program The Voice season 8 as her Top 12 act.
 Amber Galloway Gallego performed an ASL version of the song 
 The rock band Vampires Everywhere! released a cover of the song on their 2016 album Ritual, featuring Chelsea Grin vocalist Alex Koehler.
 Morgan James performed a cover version arranged by Scott Bradlee on the Postmodern Jukebox YouTube channel.
 Wé McDonald performed this song on U.S. television program The Voice season 11 as her Top 12 act.
 Sergei Polunin danced to the song, directed by David LaChapelle.
 Several artists have covered this song, including YouTube star Jasmine Thompson and Broadway actress Lena Hall.
 The song was used in season 10 of Supernatural, in episode 13 "Halt and Catch Fire".
 The song was used in commercials for the 2014 TV series Constantine on NBC.
 In early 2017 Napalm Records released a cover, with a video, by metal band The Agonist.
 In 2015, Scottish rock band Gun recorded a cover with a video, which later appeared on their 2019 best-of album R3L0ADED.
 The song was used as a central recurring theme in the third season of the teen series Druck (SKAM Germany), aired March through May 2019.
 Sharon Irving performed the song in her audition on Season 10 of America's Got Talent for which she received a golden buzzer from judge Mel B and advanced to the semi-finals.

Charts

Weekly charts

Year-end charts

Decade-end charts

Certifications

Release history

See also 
 List of best-selling singles in Australia

References

External links
 

2013 debut singles
2013 songs
Black-and-white music videos
Soul ballads
Hozier (musician) songs
Number-one singles in Austria
Ultratop 50 Singles (Flanders) number-one singles
Number-one singles in Greece
Number-one singles in Hungary
Number-one singles in Italy
Number-one singles in Poland
Number-one singles in Sweden
Number-one singles in Switzerland
2010s ballads
Viral videos
LGBT-related songs
Songs involved in plagiarism controversies
Songs critical of religion
Criticism of the Catholic Church
Hozier (musician) EPs
Songs written by Hozier (musician)
Island Records singles
Columbia Records singles